Clarence  is a community in the Canadian province of Nova Scotia, located in Annapolis County. Along with Fort Clarence (Nova Scotia), the community is named in honour of the Duke of Clarence and St. Andrews, later King William IV.

References

Communities in Annapolis County, Nova Scotia
General Service Areas in Nova Scotia